"No Night So Long" is the title track of a 1980 album by Dionne Warwick, written by Richard Kerr and Will Jennings and produced by Steve Buckingham. "No Night So Long" peaked at No.23 on the Billboard Hot 100 and spent three weeks at No.1 on the adult contemporary chart. It was Warwick's third number one on the AC chart.

Chart history

See also
List of number-one adult contemporary singles of 1980 (U.S.)

References

1980 songs
1980 singles
1980s ballads
Dionne Warwick songs
Pop ballads
Rhythm and blues ballads
Soul ballads
Songs with lyrics by Will Jennings
Songs written by Richard Kerr (songwriter)
Arista Records singles